Hoop and Grapes is a pub name. Notable pubs with this name include:

Hoop and Grapes, Aldgate High Street, London
Hoop and Grapes, Farringdon Street, London